The Strain is a 2009 vampire horror novel by Guillermo del Toro and Chuck Hogan.

The Strain may also refer to:

The Strain (TV series) based on the novel
The Strain Comic Book Series by Dark Horse Comics, also based on the novel

See also
Strain (disambiguation)